Zacharopoulos is a surname. Notable people with the surname include:

Christos Zacharopoulos, Greek musician
Denys Zacharopoulos (born 1952), Greek historian and theorist
Emilianos Zacharopoulos (1915–2011), Eastern Orthodox metropolitan bishop
Giorgos Zacharopoulos (born 1971), Greek footballer